Adrian High School may refer to:

In the United States 
Adrian High School (Michigan), Adrian, Michigan
Adrian High School (Minnesota), Adrian, Minnesota
Adrian High School (Missouri)
Adrian High School (Oregon), Adrian, Oregon
Adrian High School (Texas), Adrian, Texas
Adrian C. Wilcox High School, Santa Clara, California